Villotte-devant-Louppy (literally Villotte before Louppy) is a commune in the Meuse department in Grand Est in north-eastern France.

Geography
The village lies on the right bank of the Fluant, a stream tributary of the Chée, which forms part of the commune's southern border.

See also
Communes of the Meuse department

References

Villottedevantlouppy